Noé de la Flor Casanova (May 29, 1904 in Teapa, Tabasco – 1986 in Mexico City) was a Mexican lawyer, cantautor, writer, poet and politician who served for four years as Governor of Tabasco, before being removed from office following a scandal.

Life and work

De la Flor y Casanova was the son of Manuel de la Flor Hernández, a master tailor, and Elodia Casanova de de la Flor, the family was extremely poor. After completing primary school in Teapa he moved to Villahermosa (then called San Juan Bautista) to attend the Instituto Juárez, a preparatory school founded by Manuel Sánchez Mármol. With a scholarship, obtained for him by José Vasconcelos at the request of fellow Tabascan Carlos Pellicer, De la Flor Casanova enrolled in the National Preparatory School in Mexico City. After obtaining a law degree from the National Autonomous University of Mexico in 1930 he served in the following judicial posts: Secretary of the Criminal Courts in the Federal District from 1930–36; professor at the National Law School, UNAM, 1937–46; Justice of the Peace, 1937–39; Judge of the Superior Tribunal of Justice of the Federal Territories, 1940–42, 1946-58. He was Governor of Tabasco from 1943–46 and was removed from office following a scandal, the details of which remain obscure. He was also a founding member (1936) of the Socialist Lawyers Front of Mexico (Frente de abogados socialistas). He was, as a result of his writings, associated, in the minds of some, with a modern current of libertinage érudit.

Published works
(list not comprehensive)

Díaz Mirón, y otros poemas 1935
Madre Revolución; insurgencias líricas de Noé de la Flor Casanova 1936
Paisaje nada más 1938
Balcón al viento 1958
Ideario de Winston Churchill (1874-1965) 1965
Viajando por el mundo de mis libros: reflexiones inconexas para inteligentes y para tontos 1975
Licor del silencio: poemas 1982

See also
José Gorostiza;
Andrés Iduarte;
Salvador Novo;
Jaime Torres Bodet;
Rodolfo Usigli;
Xavier Villaurrutia

Notes

Bibliography
(English) Camp, Roderic Ai, Mexican political biographies, 1935-1993. The Hague: Mouton, 1993.
(Spanish) Acosta, Marco Antonio, Nueva antología de poetas tabasqueños contemporáneos, Mexico: Univ. J. Autónoma de Tabasco, 2006.
(Spanish) Castellanos Castilla, Gerardo, De la Flor Casanova: Isla y tierra firme. Mexico, D.F.: Editorial Cultura, 1958.
(Spanish) Castro Leal, Antonio, La poesía mexicana moderna. Mexico: Fondo de Cultura Económica, 1953.

External links
Ex-gobernadores del Estado de Tabasco
Yo te amo (song by Noé De la Flor Casanova)
Nueva antología de poetas tabasqueños contemporáneos

Governors of Tabasco
Institutional Revolutionary Party politicians

20th-century Mexican judges
20th-century Mexican poets
Mexican male poets
Mexican songwriters
Male songwriters
National Autonomous University of Mexico alumni
Academic staff of the National Autonomous University of Mexico
Politicians from Tabasco
Writers from Tabasco
1904 births
1986 deaths
20th-century Mexican male writers
20th-century Mexican educators
20th-century male musicians
20th-century Mexican politicians